Carl Amos (born 30 March 1973) is an English cricketer who has played his 13 List A games for Norfolk County Cricket Club. His highest score of 76 came when playing for Norfolk in a match against Surrey Cricket Board.

He has also played 97 Minor Counties Championship games  and 52 Minor Counties Trophy Matches for Norfolk.

References

External links

1973 births
Living people
Cricketers from King's Lynn
English cricketers
Norfolk cricketers